The Open Gaming Alliance is a non-profit organization of hardware manufacturers, game developers, game publishers and others, with the goal of promoting and advancing the PC as a gaming platform.

The PC Gaming Alliance was announced during the Game Developers Conference 2008.

In 2014, the PC Gaming Alliance changed its name to the Open Gaming Alliance and now focuses on all mainstream non-console gaming platforms, including Windows, OS X, SteamOS, Linux, desktops, laptops, and tablets.

Goals and activities
The OGA is among other things working to develop marketing for PC games, combat piracy, developing new business models beyond retail sales, and establish minimum hardware requirements for computer games, along with guidelines for developers to make games work for those requirements. According to former president Randy Stude, the PC Gaming Alliance is to "help make certain that the PC game industry had a public voice and a pulpit for accurately communicating the size, growth and overall popularity of the single largest gaming platform worldwide." They also perform market research for their members and the public.

Members

 Dell
 Arxan Technologies
 Cloud Imperium Games
 Corsair Components Inc
 Digital River
 DinoPC
 EMA
 Intel Corp.
 Lenovo
 Nexosis
 Razer USA Ltd.
 Ubisoft
 Unity
 Webroot

Former members

 38 Studios
 Acer Inc./Gateway, Inc.
 AMD
 Antec
 BFG Technologies
 Bigfoot Networks
 Epic Games
 Flextronics
 GameStop
 GameTap 
 Gas Powered Games
 Howie's Game Shack
 InstantAction
 Logitech
 Microsoft
 Nvidia
 Pyxel Arts Digital Entertainment S.L.
 Sony DADC
 Southern Methodist University Guildhall
 WildTangent

See also 
Games for Windows
GamePC Consortium—a similar organization formed in the mid-1990s
Multimedia PC, an early effort by the SPA to define levels of PC hardware capabilities

References

External links
 The official Open Gaming Alliance website
 Gaming Laptops

Video game organizations